Die Pratermizzi (literally, "Mizzi of the Prater") is an Austrian silent drama film directed by Gustav Ucicky in 1926, released in January 1927, and starring Anny Ondra, Igo Sym and Nita Naldi. The film was long believed lost until its rediscovery in 2005. The film's art direction was by Artur Berger and Emil Stepanek.

Plot
Marie, a cashier in the tunnel of love Zum Walfisch on the Prater in Vienna, and Baron Christian von B. fall in love, but their relationship is disrupted by the willful involvement of the dancer Valette, who always wears a mask. Christian eventually follows Valette to Paris. When he tears the golden mask from her face he is shocked to discover that she is disfigured by a disease. He returns to Vienna with the intention of putting an end to his life, but at the last minute Marie is able to save him.

The ride through the tunnel of love is associated in this film with the journey into one's own self.

Cast
Igo Sym as Freiherr Christian von B.
Anny Ondra as Marie
Nita Naldi as Valette, the dancer with the mask
Hedy Pfundmayr as the dancer's double
Carl Götz as Herr von Z.
Ferdinand Leopoldi as Adam Lorenz Stingl, owner of the tunnel of love
Hugo Thimig as Matthias Veitschberger

This was the last major film role of Nita Naldi, whose career did not survive the advent of the talkies.

History of the film
In 2005 a print of the Pratermizzi on a base of the inflammable cellulose nitrate was discovered in the archives of the Centre national de la cinématographie. It was successfully copied and restored in time to be shown at the opening of Prater Film Festival the same year.

Excerpts from the film were published by the Filmarchiv Austria on the DVD "Der Wiener Prater im Film" in July 2005.

References

Sources and external links

Österreichisches Filmarchiv 
Stummfilm.at 

1926 films
1927 films
1926 drama films
Austrian black-and-white films
Austrian silent feature films
Austrian drama films
Films directed by Gustav Ucicky
Films set in Vienna
Wiener Film
1920s rediscovered films
1927 drama films
Rediscovered Austrian films
Silent romantic comedy films
Silent drama films
1920s German films
1920s German-language films